Rhyzodiastes montrouzieri is a species of ground beetle in the subfamily Rhysodinae. It was described by Louis Alexandre Auguste Chevrolat in 1875. It is endemic to New Caledonia. Rhyzodiastes montrouzieri measure  in length.

References

Rhyzodiastes
Beetles of Oceania
Insects of New Caledonia
Endemic fauna of New Caledonia
Beetles described in 1875
Taxa named by Louis Alexandre Auguste Chevrolat